Jacob Frederico Torlade (in German Jacob Friedrich Torlade) (his surname went on to use the spelling Torlades), originally from Hamburg (and naturalized Portuguese on July 23, 1781), was a son of Heinrich Torlade, businessman and Elisabeth Torlade, both born and living in Hamburg.

Career
He was a businessman and a banker, connected to sea trading, Consul of the Hanseatic League Cities in Setúbal, founder and main manager of the Casa Comercial Torlades, Lord, by purchase, of the farm (quinta) of Machadas, in the parish of São Julião, term of Setúbal in 1815 to Botelho de Moraes Sarmento family (the oldest residential area, designated by Machadas de Baixo, which goes back to the 17th century).

On May 25, 1825, the farm was visited by King John VI of Portugal, accompanied by the Infanta Isabel Maria of Portugal and the Infanta Maria da Assunção of Portugal, and by the Court, being received and hosted by its proprietor, the below mentioned Carlos O'Neill, who had inherited the farm by marriage, with the crest of the O'Neill family placed over the door of the western front.

Marriage
He married Maria Inácia Gonçalves (baptized in Setúbal, São Sebastião, on April 9, 1728), daughter of Pedro Gonçalves (baptized in Alcácer do Sal, Santa Maria do Castelo, on August 10, 1688) and wife (married in Setúbal, São Sebastião, on January 13, 1715) Antónia Baptista Ramos (baptized in Setúbal, São Sebastião, on July 12, 1694), and had issue.

Descendants
His daughter Ana João Torlade (Palmela, Santa Maria (baptized in Palmela, Santa Maria, on November 4, 1758) –) married in Lisbon, Sacramento, on September 17, 1784 to the above-mentioned Carlos O'Neill (Lisbon, Santa Catarina, June 9, 1760 – June 24, 1835), the titular head of the Clanaboy O'Neill dynasty, whose family has been in Portugal since the 18th century, and had issue, nine children.

Ana João Torlade was the maternal aunt, nominately, of Jacob Frederico Torlade Pereira de Azambuja.

References

Year of birth missing
Year of death missing
18th-century Portuguese businesspeople
19th-century Portuguese businesspeople
German bankers
Diplomats from Hamburg
German emigrants to Portugal